Sexuality in Bangladesh is primarily influenced by religion and culture. The culture in Bangladesh is predominantly conservative and patriarchal. Several topics, including sex education, homosexuality, and sexual behavior are considered taboo. Over the years, the perception towards a very few taboos have changed, such as sex education is now taught in high schools.

Marriage

Arranged marriage is a cultural practice that is common place in Bangladesh. Families of the bride seek to arrange marriages with grooms that are employed, financially stable, and of reproductive age - the concept is the basis of the Bangladeshi family-system. As Bangladesh is based on social conservatism, there is a strong social and cultural prohibition on love marriage, and it is viewed negatively by a large portion of the people, though love marriages can be seen to a lesser extent.

Any discussion around sex and sexuality is considered a taboo. Bangladesh is a family-oriented Muslim country with a strong socioeconomic class structure. Cultural discussion around romance is considered to be sinful, a social crime, or a form of perverted behavior. However, there is a pocket of tolerance and acceptance for romance in Bangladesh amongst certain social classes.

Religion

The population of Bangladesh include a majority Muslim population. For this reason, most follow Islamic sexual jurisprudence, which supports sexual acts between spouses only and focuses mainly on procreation.

Sex education

Bangladesh has a sex education system in schools, though a majority of the teachers teach the subject in a conservative way. Sometimes, they skip the chapters in book which are about sexuality. Friendship with opposite gender is discouraged/prohibited in the society. There are gender segregation in so many schools where making inter-gender friendship is very hard. Despite of all these restrictions, moderate and modest friendships have always been accepted and appreciated by some urban societies.

Pornography

Watching, possessing, or producing of any kind of pornography is illegal in Bangladesh. A law against it was passed by the parliament in 2012; 244 pornographic sites and sites linked to adult content were blocked as per the rule.

Homosexuality

Homosexual sexual behavior is outlawed in Bangladesh, as Section 377 of the Penal Code forbids anal or oral sex, regardless of the gender and sexual orientation of the participants.  Thus, even consensual heterosexual acts such as fellatio and anal penetration may be punishable under this law. In 2009 and 2013, the Parliament of Bangladesh refused to overturn Section 377. In 2014, the first LGBTQ magazine was launched in Bangladesh, called Roopbaan. The same year, Bangladesh held its first Trans Pride parade.

Prostitution

Prostitution is legal since 2000, though the practice is rejected by society. Both female and male prostitution is found in brothels. There are 14 registered brothels in this country which run legally under the supervision of local police authorities.

References

Bibliography

External links

 
Society of Bangladesh
Bangladeshi culture